Dongfeng Motor Corporation Station, is a transfer station on Line 3 and Line 6 of the Wuhan Metro. It entered revenue service on December 28, 2015. It is located in Caidian District and it serves the Wuhan Stadium and the main headquarters of the Dongfeng Motor Corporation.

Station layout

Gallery

References

Wuhan Metro stations
Line 3, Wuhan Metro
Line 6, Wuhan Metro
Railway stations in China opened in 2015